The Ghost & Mrs. Muir is an American sitcom based on the 1947 film of the same name, which was based on the 1945 novel by R. A. Dick. It premiered in September 1968 on NBC. After NBC cancelled the series at the end of its first season, it was picked up by ABC for its second season before being cancelled a final time.

Premise
The series stars Hope Lange as Carolyn Muir, a young widow and writer who rents Gull Cottage, near the fictional fishing village of Schooner Bay, Maine, and moves into the rental with her two children, a housekeeper (played by Reta Shaw), and their dog. The cottage is haunted by the ghost of its former owner Daniel Gregg, a 19th-century sea captain, who died in 1869, played by Edward Mulhare. Charles Nelson Reilly plays  Claymore Gregg, the great-nephew of the captain, who rents the cottage to Mrs. Muir without telling her it is haunted by his ancestor.   

The book of the same name, by R.A. Dick, was published in 1945. It was brought to the silver screen in 1947 with Gene Tierney playing Mrs. Muir and Rex Harrison as Captain Gregg. While the movie had been a romantic fantasy combining comic and dramatic elements, the series focused much more on laughs.

Central to the series is the romantic tension between the captain and Carolyn.  While they have significant differences, the captain being a 19th Century chauvinist and Carolyn a 20th Century career woman, their mutual attraction enables them to compromise to overcome their differences.

Production and reception
The story was developed as a TV series by Jean Holloway and filmed at the Hollywood Studios. Hope Lange won two Emmy Awards for Lead Actress in a Comedy Series for 1968–1969 and 1969–1970. Despite Lange's consecutive Emmy wins, the show struggled in the ratings and only ran for two seasons. During its first year on NBC, it followed Get Smart; its Big Three competition was My Three Sons on CBS and the first half of The Lawrence Welk Show on ABC.

In spring 1969, NBC cancelled the series. ABC picked it up and scheduled it to be shown on Thursday nights at 7:30 pm in September 1969, followed by That Girl and Bewitched. The series was again unsuccessful in beating out another hit CBS series, Family Affair. It was later moved to Friday nights at 8:30 pm in January 1970, but ratings did not improve. As a result, ABC cancelled The Ghost & Mrs. Muir in spring 1970. The following year, Family Affair was cancelled by CBS after a five-year run because it was in the same time slot as the NBC hit variety series The Flip Wilson Show.

Cast
Hope Lange, as Carolyn Muir, is a widowed writer with two children.  She is in her early 30s and finds the captain both overbearing and attractive.  She is primarily concerned with caring for her children and her freelance writing career.  
Edward Mulhare, as Captain Daniel Gregg, is a poltergeist, able to affect things not only in the house, but also at a distance, and can appear and disappear at will. He can only be seen and heard by the people he chooses. His bad temper can affect the weather.  He was a sea captain in the 19th Century and died in 1869.   He frequently refers to his home, Gull Cottage, as his ship and frequently uses nautical terminology.  He does not like visitors in the house and frequently scares them away.  He sometimes makes himself visible to the primary characters, usually Carolyn and Claymore, but rarely to others.  He typically wears a suit with a turtleneck sweater but on formal occasions, wears the uniform of a U.S. Navy captain from the 1850s.  
Charles Nelson Reilly, as Claymore Gregg, is the town clerk among other jobs, a great-nephew of Captain Gregg (although the captain is often ashamed of this and claims that Claymore is not related to him), and Mrs. Muir's landlord.   He is greedy and always seeking ways to increase his income.  He is one of the few who know of the captain's continued presence, and is usually terrified of his ancestor.  Reilly made this terror of "The Captain" a running gag during his appearances on The Hollywood Squares.
Reta Shaw, as Martha Grant, is the housekeeper. Towards the very end of the series (in episode 47 of 50), the captain reveals himself to her, but during most of the series, she is unaware of the ghost.
Kellie Flanagan, as nine-year-old Candace "Candy" Muir, is Mrs. Muir's daughter. Starting in the second episode of season two, she can also see and hear the captain.
Harlen Carraher, as Jonathan Muir, is Mrs. Muir's son; from the beginning, he can see, hear, and talk to the captain.
Scruffy, as Scruffy, is the Muirs' Wire Fox Terrier.
Guy Raymond, as Ed Peevey, the local town's handyman. He was in numerous episodes.

Episodes

Home media
On April 16, 2014, Madman Entertainment released both seasons on DVD in Region 4 (Australia) for the first time. In July 2014, amazon.com started selling both seasons of The Ghost & Mrs. Muir in the United States. On 1 November 2018, Madman Entertainment released the "Complete Collection" box set. This box set contains the same individual Season 1 and 2 sets.

See also
 List of ghost films

References

External links

"...And Then I Wrote" - Interview with Kellie Flanagan (2014)

American Broadcasting Company original programming
American television series revived after cancellation
1968 American television series debuts
1970 American television series endings
1960s American sitcoms
1970s American sitcoms
American fantasy television series
Fantasy comedy television series
Television series about ghosts
Television series about families
Television series about widowhood
Television shows set in Maine
English-language television shows
Live action television shows based on films
NBC original programming
Television series by 20th Century Fox Television